Pierre-Joseph Thoulier d'Olivet, Abbot of Olivet (1 April 1682, Salins-les-Bains – 8 October 1768, Paris) was a French abbot, writer, grammarian and translator. He was elected the fourth occupant of Académie française seat 31.

External links
 

1682 births
1768 deaths
People from Jura (department)
18th-century French writers
18th-century French male writers
Grammarians from France
French translators
18th-century French Jesuits
Members of the Académie Française
French male non-fiction writers
18th-century French translators